Cloxazolam is a benzodiazepine derivative that has anxiolytic, sedative, and anticonvulsant properties.  It is not widely used;  as of August 2018 it was marketed in Belgium, Luxembourg, Portugal, Brazil, and Japan. In 2019, it has been retired from the Belgian market.

See also
 Cinazepam
 Gidazepam

References

External links
 Inchem.org - Cloxazolam

Anxiolytics
Chloroarenes
Lactams
Oxazolobenzodiazepines
Prodrugs